Mark McLean (born February 5, 1975) is a Canadian musician, drummer, composer, lyricist and studio musician. McLean lives and works primarily in New York.  He has released three albums under his own name. The first showcases his arrangements of jazz standards while his later albums are original material (except one song).  His very early influence was his father's record collection, which included every genre: from Johann Sebastian Bach to James Brown.  McLean is becoming known as the "drum whisperer" in part because he can coax organic sounds out of any drum kit.  McLean is musically multilingual: jazz, rhythm and blues, funk, pop or any genre required for the song.

McLean's great uncle, Cy McLean was one of the first black band leaders in Canada.  His brother Lester McLean is an accomplished saxophonist and vocalist in the Toronto jazz and RnB scene.

McLean began his career at age nine as a gifted classical pianist, but by age 14 had started a second career playing the drums. By the time he was 18, the drums eclipsed the piano as McLean's voice for musical expression and the age of 22 he was playing with fellow Canadian and jazz icon, Oscar Peterson.

McLean graduated with honors from The University of Toronto with a bachelor's in performance in jazz. In his third year faculty member Don Thompson invited him to play on the first of the more than 70 recordings on which McLean appears. He was also named "Post-secondary Musician of the Year" by the Jazz Report Magazine in 1998. That summer McLean taught at Canada's Interprovincial Music Camp (jazz).  He was also the jazz director at Sir John A. Macdonald Collegiate Institute while taking his undergraduate degree.

McLean's recording and touring highlights include George Michael, Gladys Knight, Joe Sample, Jamie Cullum, Andy Bey, Molly Johnson, Peter Cincotti, Andrea Bocelli, Serena Ryder, Catherine Russell, Jane Bunnett, Billy Joel, Dionne Warwick and Michael Kaeshammer.

McLean has two movie appearances: Drummer in Peter Cincotti band in Spider-Man 2  (uncredited) and Peter Cincotti: Live in New York (credited).

McLean is endorsed by Regal Tip  Mallets and Brushes, Zildjian Sticks and Cymbals, Remo drum heads  and Yamaha Drums.

New York 

McLean moved to New York City in 1999 following receipt of a grant awarded him by the Canada Council for the Arts.  Initially, McLean wanted to study with his idol, world-renowned drummer, Brian Blade.  Although he did not teach, Blade mentored McLean by allowing him to observe his performances.  He even helped him shop for a drum kit and as luck would have it, they walked into Drummer's World on 46th street in Manhattan and met jazz drummer, archivist and radio personality, Kenny Washington.  Blade said to McLean "this is who you should study with." McLean studied with Kenny Washington for a year followed by an additional year with drummer Billy Kilson.  After that McLean decided to stay for future opportunities in New York. Singer and pianist Andy Bey was the first to call, then Dewey Redman.

Work with other artists 

McLean has worked with many of jazz masters and pop icons, including Wynton Marsalis, Michael Feinstein, Billy Joel, Quincy Jones, Gladys Knight, Diana Krall, Glen Campbell, Carla Cook, Linda Eder, Jimmy Webb, Vanessa Williams, Patti Austin, the Backstreet Boys and producer Phil Ramone. He also served as arranger on Molly Johnson's 2009 Juno-award-winning album Lucky, and was co-arranger on Sophie Milman's 2009 release Take Love Easy, while continuing to tour and record as a member of George Michael's band.

Producer Phil Ramone following a recording session with Billy Joel remarked: "Mark McLean is a tasty, sure handed drummer, a song man’s musician."  Andy Bey described McLean as "an intelligent, immensely talented young musician with a curious mind and a listening ear."

Albums

Reviews and awards

Session work

References 

1975 births
Canadian jazz composers
Male jazz composers
Canadian jazz drummers
Canadian male drummers
Canadian record producers
Canadian songwriters
Living people
Musicians from Toronto
People from North York
University of Toronto people
Canadian male pianists
21st-century Canadian pianists
21st-century Canadian drummers
21st-century Canadian male musicians